CFR Title 8 – Aliens and Nationality is one of fifty titles composing the United States Code of Federal Regulations (CFR), containing the principal set of rules and regulations issued by federal agencies regarding aliens and nationality. It is available in digital and printed form, and can be referenced online using the Electronic Code of Federal Regulations (e-CFR).

Structure 

The table of contents, as reflected in the e-CFR updated March 5, 2014, is as follows:

References 

 08